I milanesi ammazzano il sabato is a studio album by Italian Alternative Rock band Afterhours, published May 2, 2008 from Universal Music. 

On October 24, 2008 is also published in the reissue of the disc with a CD that includes six additional tracks and two unreleased live version: Due di Noi and You Know You're Right (Nirvana cover).

The title is inspired by Giorgio Scerbanenco' noir novel I milanesi ammazzano al sabato.

Track listing
 Naufragio sull'isola del tesoro - 1:39
 È solo febbre - 2:11
 Neppure carne da cannone per Dio - 2.23
 Tarantella all'inazione - 5:09
 Pochi istanti nella lavatrice - 4:09
 I milanesi ammazzano il sabato - 2:13
 Riprendere Berlino - 4:03
 Tutti gli uomini del presidente - 2:15
 Musa di nessuno - 2:16
 Tema: la mia città - 2:44
 È dura essere Silvan - 2:27
 Dove si va da qui - 4:35
 Tutto domani - 2:59
 Orchi e streghe sono soli (ninna nanna reciproca) - 3:45

Charts

References

2008 albums
Afterhours (band) albums